The Smith & Wesson Model 10, previously known as the Smith & Wesson .38 Hand Ejector Model of 1899, the Smith & Wesson Military & Police or the Smith & Wesson Victory Model, is a K-frame revolver of worldwide popularity. In production since 1899, the Model 10 is a six-shot, .38 Special, double-action revolver with fixed sights. Some 6,000,000 of the type have been produced over the years, making it the most popular handgun of the 20th century.

History

In 1899, the United States Army and Navy placed orders with Smith & Wesson for two to three thousand Model 1899 Hand Ejector revolvers chambered for the M1892 .38 Long Colt U.S. Service Cartridge. With this order, the Hand Ejector Model became known as the .38 Military and Police model. That same year, in response to reports from military sources serving in the Philippines on the relative ineffectiveness of the new cartridge, Smith & Wesson began offering the Military & Police in a new chambering, .38 S&W Special (a.k.a. .38 Special), a slightly elongated version of the .38 Long Colt cartridge with greater bullet weight (158 grains) and powder charge increased from 18 to 21 grains of gunpowder.

In 1902, the .38 Military & Police (2nd Model) was introduced and featured substantial changes. These included major modification and simplification of the internal lockwork and the addition of a locking underlug on the barrel to engage the previously free-standing ejector rod. Barrel lengths were 4-, 5-, 6-, and 6.5-inches with a rounded butt. Serial numbers for the Military & Police ranged from number 1 in the series to 20,975. Most of the early M&P revolvers chambered in .38 Special appear to have been sold to the civilian market.  By 1904, S&W was offering the .38 M&P with a rounded or square butt, and 4-, 5-, and 6.5-inch barrels.

World War I

The .38 S&W Military & Police Model of 1905 4th Change, introduced 1915, incorporated a passive hammer block and enlarged service sights that quickly became a standard across the service revolver segment of the industry. The M&P revolver was issued in large numbers during World War I, where it proved itself to be a highly reliable and accurate weapon. Although WWI saw the rise of semi-automatic pistols, revolvers such as the M&P were used in vast numbers as semi-automatic handgun production at the time wasn't sufficient to meet the demand.

After the War, the M&P would become the standard issue police sidearm for the next 70 years. It would also become very popular with civilian shooters, with several new models being made, including the first snubnosed 2-, 2.5- and 3-inch barrel models being made in 1936.

World War II
The S&W M&P military revolvers produced from 1942 to 1944 had serial numbers with a "V" prefix, and were known as the Smith & Wesson Victory Model. Early Victory Models did not always have the V prefix. During World War II 590,305 of these revolvers were supplied to the United Kingdom, Canada, Australia, New Zealand, and South Africa under the Lend-Lease program, chambered in the British .38/200 caliber already in use in the Enfield No 2 Mk I Revolver and the Webley Mk IV Revolver. Most Victory Models sent to Britain were fitted with 4-inch or 5-inch barrels, although a few early versions had 6-inch barrels. The 5-inch barrel was standard production after 4 April 1942. The Office of Strategic Services (OSS) supplied thousands of these revolvers to resistance forces. Thousands of Victory Model revolvers remained in United States Army inventories following World War II for arming foreign military and security personnel.

An additional 352,315 Victory Model revolvers chambered in the well-known and popular .38 Special cartridge were used by United States forces during World War II. The Victory Model was a standard-issue sidearm for United States Navy and Marine Corps aircrews, and was also used by security guards at factories and defense installations throughout the United States during the war. Although the latter personnel could use conventional lead bullets, Remington Arms manufactured REM UMC 38 SPL headstamped cartridges loaded with a  full metal jacket bullet for military use in overseas combat zones. Tracer ammunition was manufactured for signaling purposes.

Initial production of 65,000 4-inch-barreled revolvers for Navy aircrew bypassed standard procurement procedures, and quality suffered without traditional inspection procedures. Quality improved when Army ordnance inspectors became involved in early 1942, and the design was modified in 1945 to include an improved hammer block after a sailor was killed by a loaded revolver discharging when accidentally dropped onto a steel deck. Many aircrew preferred to carry the revolver rather than the heavier M1911 pistol. Pilots often preferred a shoulder holster in the confined space of a cockpit, but a hip holster was also available for security personnel.

Some of these revolvers remained in service well into the 1990s with units of the United States Armed Forces, including the United States Air Force and the Coast Guard. Until the introduction of the Beretta M9 9mm pistol in 1990, U.S. Army helicopter crew members and female military police were equipped with .38 caliber Victory Model revolvers. Five-hundred revolvers with two-inch barrels were delivered on 22 August 1944 for Criminal Investigation Division agents. The Victory Model remained in use with Air National Guard tanker and transport crews as late as Operation Desert Storm in 1991, and with United States Navy security personnel until 1995.

Some Lend-Lease Victory Model revolvers originally chambered for the British .38/200 were returned to the United States and rechambered to fire the more popular and more powerful .38 Special ammunition, and such revolvers are usually so marked on their barrels. Rechambering of .38-200 cylinders to .38 Special results in oversized chambers, which may cause problems.

Lee Harvey Oswald used a Victory Model to murder J.D. Tippit shortly after assassinating President John F. Kennedy. It was found in his possession when he was apprehended on November 22, 1963.

The finish on Victory Models was typically a sandblasted and parkerized finish, which is noticeably different from the higher-quality blue or nickel/chrome finishes usually found on commercial M&P/Model 10 revolvers. Other distinguishing features of the Victory Model revolver are the lanyard loop at the bottom of the grip frame, and the use of smooth (rather than checkered) walnut grip panels. However, some early models did use a checkered grip, most notably the pre-1942 manufacture.

Model 10
After World War II, Smith & Wesson returned to manufacturing the M&P series. Along with cosmetic changes and replacement of the frame fitting grip with the Magna stocks, the spring-loaded hammer block safety gave way to a cam-actuated hammer block that rode in a channel in the side plate (Smith 1968). In the late 1950s, Smith & Wesson adopted the convention of using numeric designations to distinguish their various models of handguns, and the M&P was renamed the Model 10.

The M&P/Model 10 has been available in both blued steel finish and nickel finish for most of its production run. The model has also been offered throughout the years with both the round butt and square butt grip patterns. Beginning with the Model 10–5 series in the late 1960s, the tapered barrel and its trademark 'half moon' front sight (as shown in the illustrations on this page) were replaced by a straight bull barrel and a sloped milled ramp front sight. Late model Model 10s are capable of handling any .38 Special cartridge produced today up to and including +P+ rounds.

 the Model 10 was available only in a 4-inch barrel model, as was its stainless steel (Inox) counterpart, the Smith & Wesson Model 64. Some 6,000,000 M&P revolvers have been produced over the years, making it the most popular handgun of the 20th century.

Model 10 variants

.357 Magnum variations
After a small prototype run of Model 10-6 revolvers in .357 Magnum caliber, Smith & Wesson introduced the Model 13 heavy barrel in carbon steel and then the Model 65 in stainless steel. Both revolvers featured varying barrel weights and lengths—generally three and four inches with and without underlugs (shrouds). Production dates begin in 1974 for the Model 13 and end upon discontinuation in 1999. The Model 65 was in production from 1972 to 1999. Both the blued and stainless models were popular with police and FBI, and a variation of the Model 65 was marketed in the Lady Smith line from 1992 to 1999.

.38 S&W variations 
From the late 1940s to early 1960s Smith & Wesson made a Variation of the Model 10 chambered for .38 S&W called the Model 11 that was sent to British Commonwealth countries to supply their armies and police forces. They were sent to Canada as well.

Replacement 
The S&W Model 10 revolver was a popular weapon before the semi-automatic pistol replaced the revolver in many police departments, as well as police units and armies.

 Certain units of the Ireland's Gardaí (Irish Police) had replaced the Model 10 by the SIG Sauer P226 and Walther P99C semi-automatic pistols.
Victoria Police replaced the K frame model 10 with the M&P in .40 S&W.
New Zealand Police replaced the revolver with the Glock 17.
 New South Wales Police Force replaced the Model 10 with the Glock 22, Glock 23 and Glock 27.
 The weapon was used by Norway's Home Guard until 1986 and the Norwegian Police Service until 2008, being replaced by the Heckler & Koch P30
 Portuguese police replaced the weapon by the Walther PP, subsequently by the Glock 19.
 Royal Malaysia Police used the Model 10 as a standard sidearm from the early 1970s alongside the Model 15 before it was replaced by the Beretta Px4 Storm and Walther P99. It was used by Police Volunteer Reserve as a standard sidearm and also by RELA Corps for training and self-defence purpose for their officers along with the Smith & Wesson Model 36 2 inch barrel.
 The Model 10 was formerly the standard issue for many firearms-trained police officers in the United Kingdom and in many forces they were replaced by the Glock 17.
 The weapon was used by United States Army and United States Marine Corps, only to be replaced by the M1911A1 and the M9 pistols.  Prior to the introduction of the M9 pistol in 1985, the Army and the Marine Corps issued Model 10s to aircrew members and female military policemen (both officers and enlisted MPs). Snub nose versions were used by Criminal Investigation Division (CID) agents.
 The Model 10-6 was used by uniform staff of the New York State Department of Corrections and Community Supervision until 2017 when it was replaced by the Glock 17. The Glock 19 and Glock 26 were already in use by Community Supervison (for parole officers) and OSI (Office of Special Investigation).

Users

Many of the S & W Military & Police revolvers were captured and used by some of the police forces, such as the Austrian Police, during the occupation after World War II. It is incorrect to refer to them as "the Model 10" as model numbers were not introduced by Smith & Wesson until 1957. Note that, during First World War, copies (slightly undersized) of the Military & Police were produced in Eibar and Guernica (Spain), in 8mm 1892 caliber for the French armies; the Milice man on the right holds such a copy.

The weapon is currently used by French cash couriers and banks, Disciplined Services of Hong Kong, Myanmar Police Force officers and other Burmese paramilitary units, Peruvian National Police and other police units.

A few copies of Smith & Wesson Model 10 were produced in Israel by Israel Military Industries (IMI) as the Revolver IMI 9mm. The weapon was chambered in the 9mm Luger caliber, instead of .38 Special, the original caliber. Also, Norinco of China has manufactured the NP50, which is a copy of the Smith & Wesson Model 64, since 2000.

List

 – Was used by police across the country. Replaced by multiple different semi-automatic pistols between 1990 and 2010.
 – Various Police Forces.

 – Hong Kong Police Force.
 – Armed officers of the Icelandic Police, Replaced by the Glock 17. The Icelandic Coast Guard has also used the Model 10 in the past.
 
 – Armed units of the Garda Síochána (To be phased out). 

 – Used in some prefectural police headquarters since late 1940s.

 – Received from US Government during Laotian Civil War.

 

 – Used by police and security forces
 – standard firearm of Norwegian Police Service from 1981 until about 2007.
 
 - Used by the Panama Defense Forces.
 – used during the Chaco War.

  – Used by the Singapore Police Force before switching to the Taurus Model 85 revolvers in 2002 and the Model 85 revolver's are still in service today.

 : Used by Korean National Police Agency. Also previously utilised by ROK Forces during the Korean War and Vietnam War.
 

– Emniyet Genel Müdürlüğü (Turkish National Police). Used between 1951 and the mid-1990s.
 – formerly a police-issue weapon.
 – Various Police Forces, and Departments of Corrections. Also used by the US Army.

See also
 Colt Official Police
 Enfield No. 2
 M1917 revolver
 Nagant M1895
 New Nambu M60
 Service pistol
 Webley Revolver

References

External links

 World Guns page
 

.38 Special firearms
Military revolvers
Police weapons
Revolvers of the United States
Smith & Wesson revolvers
World War I infantry weapons of the United Kingdom
World War I infantry weapons of the United States
World War II infantry weapons of the United Kingdom
World War II infantry weapons of the United States
Weapons of the Philippine Army